Grand Central Tower (also known as 175 Park Avenue) was a scrapped proposal by Penn Central to have a skyscraper built on top of Grand Central Terminal in 1968. The plan itself drew major opposition from the public and architects, especially from Jacqueline Kennedy Onassis, as it would have resulted in the destruction of the terminal. The plan was scrapped after it was settled in a court case in 1978, which meant Penn Central could not build the tower.

Previous proposals to replace Grand Central 
By the 1950s, passenger volumes at Grand Central Terminal had declined dramatically from the early 20th century, and there were proposals to demolish and replace the station. The New York Central Railroad was losing money, partially on paying taxes on the building's air rights. New York Central wanted to sell the property or its air rights to allow the construction of a skyscraper above or on the terminal's site. Meanwhile, traffic around Grand Central Terminal worsened in the late 1950s.

Two competing plans for the replacement of Grand Central Terminal were proposed in 1954. One such design, by I. M. Pei, was suggested by New York Central's chairman Robert R. Young along with developer William Zeckendorf. The proposal called for an 80-story,  tower that would have succeeded the Empire State Building as the world's tallest building. In March 1955, Zeckendorf was named the partner for any new development in the vicinity of Grand Central. Zeckendorf and Pei modified the blueprints for their 80-story tower to 108 stories but never publicly announced the revised plans. Unpublished drawings indicate that Pei's second design was supposed to be a hyperboloid-shaped tower. For various reasons, the hyperboloid tower never progressed past the planning stage. The building had faced extensive criticism from both professionals and the general public; the railroads faced significant financial shortfalls; and the economy as a whole had started to decline, leaving Zeckendorf unable to finance the project.

In 1958, a modified proposal for a 50-story tower, originally known as Grand Central City, was approved. It became known as the Pan Am Building when it was completed in 1963. The structure was built on the site of the former Grand Central Terminal Baggage Building, which was demolished to make way for its construction. 

Although the Pan Am Building's completion averted the terminal's imminent destruction, New York Central continued to decline, and in 1968 it merged with the Pennsylvania Railroad to form the Penn Central Railroad. The Pennsylvania Railroad had started demolishing Penn Station's original station building in 1963, and over the following years, it was replaced with the current Pennsylvania Station, above which was built Madison Square Garden. The demolition of Penn Station directly resulted in the creation of the New York City Landmarks Preservation Commission, which made Grand Central Terminal a designated city landmark in August 1967.

Penn Central's 175 Park Avenue 

In February 1968, six months after Grand Central Terminal was landmarked, plans were announced for a tower over the terminal, to be designed by Marcel Breuer. The tower would have spared the Main Concourse, using the existing building's support structure and four huge trusses to cantilever over the concourse, but the southern third of the terminal would have been destroyed to make way for elevator lobbies and a taxi drop-off area. The Pershing Square Viaduct would also be partially demolished to make way for a modern freeway.

The plans drew huge opposition from the public and from architects. The most prominent criticisms came from Jacqueline Kennedy Onassis, who stated:

In response to criticism, Penn Central modified the proposal in June 1969, decreasing the footprint of the proposed building and relocating it closer to the Pan Am Building. However, because of Grand Central's landmark status, the Landmarks Preservation Commission prohibited Penn Central from executing either of Breuer's two blueprints. The railroad sued the city, alleging a taking, and in January 1975, a judge for the New York Supreme Court invalidated the New York City landmark designation. Major personalities and the public held rallies to prevent the demolition of the terminal, and the New York Supreme Court's decision was overturned by an appeals court that December. The railroad's lawsuit against the city, Penn Central Transportation Co. v. New York City, was decided by the Supreme Court of the United States in 1978. In a 6–3 decision, the Supreme Court ruled in favor of the city, holding that New York City's Landmarks Preservation Act did not constitute a "taking" of Penn Central's property under the Fifth Amendment. That final ruling prevented Penn Central from constructing the proposed tower.

References

Citations

Bibliography

 
 
 
 
 

Park Avenue
Midtown Manhattan
Grand Central Terminal
Unbuilt buildings and structures in New York City